Lepage or LePage or Le Page is a surname that may refer to:

 Antoine-Simon Le Page du Pratz (1695?–1775), author of a memoir about early 18th century Louisiana
 Bradford William LePage (1876–1958), Canadian politician
 Corinne Lepage (born 1951), French politician
 Ebenezer Le Page, character in a novel by G. B. Edwards
 Frédéric Lepage, French television writer and producer
 G. Peter Lepage, (born 1952) Canadian American theoretical physicist
 Guy A. Lepage (born 1960), Canadian comedian and producer
 Henri Lepage (disambiguation)
 Henry Le Page (1792–1854), French gunsmith
 Jean le Page, known as John Pagus
 Jean Le Page (1779–1822), French gunsmith
 Jean Le Page, known as Yann ar Floc'h, (1881–1936), Breton folklorist
 Jean-François Lepage (born 1960), French photographer
 Jules Bastien-Lepage  (1848–1884), French naturalist painter
 Kevin Lepage (born 1962), American NASCAR driver
 Marquise Lepage (born 1959), Canadian producer, screenwriter, and film and television director
 Octavio Lepage Barreto (born 1923), Venezuelan politician
 Paul LePage (born 1948), former Republican governor of the U.S. State of Maine
 Pierre Le Page (1746–1834), French gunsmith
 René Lepage de Sainte-Claire (1656–1718), founder of the town of Rimouski, in Québec, Canada
 Robert Lepage (born 1957), Canadian playwright, actor, and director, from Québec
 Théophile Lepage (1901–1991), Belgian mathematician

Places 
Saint-Joseph-de-Lepage, Quebec, a Canadian municipality
Lepage River, Canada

Companies 
 Fauré Le Page, French firearms manufacturer
 Platt-LePage Aircraft Company, American aircraft company
 Royal LePage, Canadian real estate brokerage company